Under stjärnornas parasoll is an album from Swedish pop singer Cecilia Vennersten, released on 25 October 2006. She has worked with songwriters as Emma Holland, Johan Sahlén, Simen M. Eriksrud and Stein Austrud to write the songs. "Ett stulet ögonblick" was tested for Svensktoppen.

Track listing
Fri
Människa
Ett stulet ögonblick
Nåt så underbart
Varje gång jag ser dig
Du är så rar
Ringar på vatten
Du gav dig av
Leva
Jag är inte hon
Min sång

References

External links

2006 albums
Cecilia Vennersten albums